Radio Active may refer to:
Radio Active (radio series), a radio comedy programme broadcast on BBC Radio 4 during the 1980s
Radio Active (TV series), a television show on YTV in Canada
Radio Active (New Zealand), a radio station based in Wellington, New Zealand
Radio Active (Sweden), a radio station based in Ystad, Sweden
Radio Active (Fuzzy Haskins album), 1978
Radio Active (Pat Travers album)
Radio:Active, a 2008 album by British pop punk band McFly

See also 
Radioactive (disambiguation)
Radioactive decay
Radioactive Man (disambiguation)